The following article is a List of aircraft of Poland during World War II.

List of 1939-1945
(Built vs Used in Combat)

Fighters
PZL P.11 (175 vs 140) 
PZL P.7  (105 vs 30) - obsolete by 1939

Light/Tactical Bombers
PZL 23A Karaś (30 vs 0) - experimental version
PZL 23B Karaś (170 vs 120)
PZL.46 Sum - (2 vs 2) - prototypes only

Medium/Heavy Bombers
PZL 37 Los (61 vs 36) - few built due to Polish Army objections and only a few in operational condition
PZL 30 Żubr (30 vs 0) - obsolete by 1939
PZL.49 Miś - never built due to outbreak of World War 2

Reconnaissance/Close Support aircraft
Lublin R-XIII (150 vs 55)
LWS-3 Mewa (2 vs 2) - prototypes only
RWD-14 Czapla (60 vs 40)

Trainers
PWS-10 (80 vs ?)
PWS-26 (320 vs ?)
RWD-8  (550 vs ?)

Transports
PWS-24bis (3 vs 3)

See also
Polish Air Force order of battle in 1939

References

 
Poland